Karel Fraeye (born 16 November 1977), is a Belgian  football manager who is currently managing Lokeren-Temse.

Career
After almost 10 years as a youth coach with Premier League Club KAA Gent and FC Destelbergen, he started his senior managerial career with second division KSV Sottegem in 2010. After spending three years in charge and achieving two promotions of Belgian Fourth Division A club K.F.C. Eendracht Zele, Fraeye had a short stint as an assistant to head coach José Riga at Charlton Athletic. By his own account, he then continued to work for Charlton's owner, Roland Duchâtelet as Sport Director for AD Alcorcón. In October 2015, he was announced as head coach at Charlton, quitting the job he then held at Belgian third division club, VW Hamme. He was sacked on 13 January 2016, having won just two out of his ten matches while in charge.

In February 2016, Fraeye was appointed head coach of Belgian Second Division team Lommel United, with the initial aim of preventing relegation. Fraeye succeeded in promoting the team at the second level, but left the club the next season in the beginning of October following a 3-6 home loss to Tubize, which dropped Lommel United to last place.

References

External links
 

1977 births
Living people
Belgian football managers
Charlton Athletic F.C. managers
English Football League managers
Sportspeople from Brussels
K.F.C. Eendracht Zele managers
Lommel S.K. managers
21st-century Belgian people